Karen Heinrich (born 15 August 1968) is a German former handball player. She won the gold medal with German national team at the 1993 World Women's Handball Championship.

Career
Heinrich is 1.87 meters tall and was primarily used in left back position. She started handball at BSG Motor Falkensee, then played for ASK Vorwärts Frankfurt and its successor clubs BFV Frankfurt and Frankfurter HC. In her 13-year long spell with Frankfurt, she was 3-time East German League and 2-time East German Cup champion and won the EHF Cup in 1990.

Heinrich was part of the World Champion Germany squad at the 1993 World Women's Handball Championship in Norway. She mainly used as an alternative, and played only in 3 of the 7 matches, scoring 3 goals. She  represented East Germany before the German reunification and won a bronze medal at the 1990 World Women's Handball Championship where East Germany national team placed 3rd. Throughout her career, Heinrich played in combined total of 64 international matches for her national teams and scored 71 goals.

Honours

National team
World Championship:
Winner: 1993
Bronze Medalist: 1990

Clubs
EHF Cup:
Winner: 1989/90
East German Championship:
Winner: 1985/86, 1986/87, 1989/90
East German Cup:
Winner: 1985/86, 1989/90

References 

1968 births
Living people
Handball players from Berlin
People from East Berlin
German female handball players
East German female handball players